Simeon V. Marcelo (born October 21, 1953) is a Filipino lawyer and was the third Ombudsman of the Philippines. As the Ombudsman, he acted as protector of the people against the illegal and unjust acts of those who are in the public service. He investigated government officials, including members of the police and the military, who were suspected of committing graft and corruption. Notably, he served as the principal private prosecutor in the impeachment case (and as head public prosecutor in the subsequent criminal prosecution for Plunder) of  Former President Joseph Estrada, the 13th President of the Republic of the Philippines. After 3 years as Ombudsman, he resigned due to serious health problems. He was then replaced by Ma. Merceditas N. Gutierrez.

Prior to being the Ombudsman, he was appointed head of the Office of the Solicitor General of the Philippines, representing the Government of the Philippines, its agencies and instrumentalists and its officials and agents in any litigation, proceeding, investigation or matter requiring the services of a lawyer, replacing Justice Ricardo Galvez. Thereafter, Justice Alfredo Benipayo was appointed as his replacement.

Education
He took his undergraduate degree in the Ateneo de Manila University where he finished his Bachelor of Arts in Philosophy with honors. He then took up and finished his Bachelor of Laws at the University of the Philippines and was among the top ten of the graduating class of 1979. He later placed fifth (with a rating of 89.9%) in the 1979 Philippine Bar Examination. As a law student, he was the recipient of the Crispin Llamado Scholarship Award. He also became a member of various prestigious academic organizations such as the Pi Gamma Mu International Social Science Honor Society and the Order of the Purple Feather Honor Society.

As a litigation lawyer
Prior to joining the government, Atty. Marcelo was a senior partner and head of litigation department of then Carpio Villaraza & Cruz Law  Offices. While still in private practice, he was already known in legal circles as one of the country's top litigators, despite maintaining a low profile. His mastery of both the technical and substantive aspects of the law earned him the reputation of being a court general and strategist.

Impeachment of President Estrada

Atty. Simeon V. Marcelo first attained national prominence in late 2000 during the Senate impeachment trial of then President Joseph Estrada. As the selected lead private trial prosecutor in the first impeachment proceedings against a sitting president, Sonny Marcelo displayed his skills as a seasoned litigator when he presented the prosecution's star witness, Ilocos Sur Gov Luis “Chavit” Singson.

The day after the first of the three days (13–15 December 2000) that Governor Singson was presented on the witness stand, the Philippine Daily Inquirer published an article (together with a photo showing Atty. Marcelo propounding questions to Governor Singson) on its front page. The article, entitled “House prosecution panel get a big favor”, reads in part:

	“Whoever suggested the engagement of the services of lawyer Simeon Marcelo to conduct the direct examination of Ilocos Sur Gov. Luis Singson in yesterday’s hearing did the prosecution a big favor. So far, Marcelo appears to be doing a good job. He has skillfully guided Singson through the maze of transactions he allegedly undertook for the benefit of President Estrada without inviting serious objections from the defense lawyers.

“Marcelo’s expertise in trial work showed in the case by which he matched the questions with the entries in the ledgers and checks presented to the impeachment court to get the desired answers. He was effective in the use of clear and easy-to-understand Filipino in the conduct of the direct examination. Not only did the use of the native language put Singson at ease in answering his questions, he was able to communicate directly to the part of the radio and TV audience who are not fluent in the English language.” (14 December 2000 issue)

In another article that appeared later in the same newspaper, it was commented that:

	“HIS impeccable courtroom manners, boyish smile and quick, appropriate answers to the questions of the chief justice, senator-judges and defense panel won the hearts of the viewers of the impeachment trial. Simeon Marcelo, one of the private prosecutors in the impeachment trial, handled the direct examination of star witness Governor Luis ‘Chavit’ Singson, and became, in the process, one of the leading lights in this historical trial.  x x x  During the entire proceeding, Marcelo, though low-key and unassuming, stood out. In fact, he was brilliant. Cool and unflappable, he was so prepared, nothing could have surprised or unnerved him. x x x” (Philippine Daily Inquirer, 14 February 2001, at page B13)

Sonny's selection as the lead private trial prosecutor was not a whimsical coincidence or merely a matter of relationship, being the personal lawyer of then Vice President Gloria Macapagal Arroyo. When he was chosen, it was already known that former President Estrada has engaged the services of former Solicitor General and Justice Secretary Estelito Mendoza to lead his defense panel:

“As head litigator (of Carpio Villaraza & Cruz Law Offices), Mr. Marcelo represented or fought some of the country’s most powerful people. A wealthy former client was property owner Henry Sy, who, in 1993, was threatened with a takeover bid by fellow shareholders in SM Megamall. Mr. Marcelo came up and won against lawyer Estelito Mendoza, who recently represented Mr. Estrada during his impeachment trial.

That proved Mr. Marcelo’s second victory against the future Estrada lawyer. The first time he locked horns with Mr. Mendoza was 10 years before, when the martial law government of President Ferdinand Marcos shut down several textile mills suspected of smuggling. One of the textile mill owners sought help from CV&C, which in turn petitioned the courts to have the company reopened. Mr. Marcelo secured a temporary order for government to reopen the plant, but the latter asked the court to reconsider. When both sides were about to argue on the motion, the government’s counsel, a lawyer about 20 years older than Mr. Marcelo, gave way to a familiar face: then Solicitor General Mendoza.” (Men’s Zone, March 2001, at page 47)

As fate would have it, the impeachment proceeding was not completed and there was no resolution of the charges against then President Estrada. During the 16 January 2001 session, a closed envelope that the pro-Estrada Senators (who composed the majority of the Senate) refused to open prompted the prosecution to walk out of the halls of the Senate. The walk-out triggered, within minutes that it was announced in the media, massive protest rallies nationwide.

The Trial of the Century
On 9 February 2001, President Gloria Macapagal Arroyo hand-picked Sonny Marcelo to head the Office of the Solicitor General.  Thereafter, due to his significant accomplishments as Solicitor General, he was appointed as Ombudsman in October 2002. At the age of 49, he became the youngest lawyer ever appointed to this illustrious and very powerful position.  [Atty. Marcelo served as the Solicitor General of the Republic of the Philippines from 15 February 2001 to 16 October 2002: he was among the youngest ever appointed to such position.]

Atty. Sonny Marcelo's stint in public service, though quite distinguished for his many outstanding achievements, will forever be remembered by the public for his role as the head of the prosecution panel in the very first criminal prosecution and conviction of a former president.  In what is widely acclaimed as the “Trial of the Century”, then Solicitor General Marcelo, who was deputized in April 2001 by then Ombudsman Aniano Desierto as one of the principal prosecutors, initially acted as the “de facto” head of the legal panel that was in charge of prosecuting former President Joseph Estrada for plunder at the Sandiganbayan. He later became the official head of the legal panel when he was appointed Ombudsman in October 2002.

As head of the prosecution team, Sonny Marcelo did not only play the role of “General” but also, in certain instances, acted as a field “commando”. Thus, apart from devising the prosecution's strategy and trial tactics, doing the final review of the pleadings and studying the proposed testimonies of the witnesses, he also personally presented three “star” witnesses, namely: Gov. Luis “Chavit” Singson, Clarissa Ocampo and Manuel Curato, of the prosecution.

Amidst threats to his person and family, the lack of financial resources and legal personnel and despite a phalanx of expensive lawyers hired by former President Estrada, Sonny Marcelo, with only a handful of dedicated public and private lawyers to assist him, persevered until the completion of the criminal proceedings against the former.

When he left government service due to health reasons in November 2005, Sonny Marcelo continued to serve as the head, though again in a “de facto” capacity, of the legal panel that was prosecuting former President Estrada. A month after the effective date (30 November 2005) of his resignation as Ombudsman, he started reviewing all the records, including the transcripts of stenographic notes, of the case and personally drafted the final memorandum for the prosecution for submission to the Sandiganbayan. (With the submission of their respective memoranda by the prosecution and the defense, the case was deemed submitted for resolution.) Further, he, together with the other members of the legal panel, advised then Special Prosecutor Dennis Villa-Ignacio on the cross-examination of the defense witnesses, particularly accused former President Estrada. In fact, until the termination of the Estrada plunder case in 2007, Sonny Marcelo temporarily shelved the revival of his legal career, opting not to return immediately to private practice and thus, eschewing lucrative cases which came his way, to vigilantly pursue what to him was the most important case not only in his professional life but in the history of our nation.

On 12 September 2007, after six years of continuous trial, the Sandiganbayan rendered a judgment convicting former President Estrada for plunder and imposing on him the penalty of reclusion perpetua.  As reported in the 13 September 2007 front page of the issue of the Philippine Daily Inquirer:

“‘I TOOK A GAMBLE,’ JOSEPH Estrada said—and the nation watched as the gambler lost.

It generally subdued proceedings that lasted barely 15 minutes and broadcast live on radio and television, the Sandiganbayan's Special Division yesterday pronounced the 70-year-old ousted President guilty of plunder and sentenced him up to 40 years in prison. He left the courtroom teary-eyed and trailed by weeping family members and supporters.

x x x x

“The court observed that this was the first case of plunder to be filed against ‘the highest official of the land, a former President, among others.’ 

‘Needless to state, the resolution of this case shall set significant historical and legal precedents,’ it said.” (Philippine Daily Inquirer, 13 September 2007, at pages 1, A-21)

Indeed, it is a testament to the high level of professionalism and dedication of Sonny Marcelo and his legal team that former President Estrada had acknowledged his guilt when he accepted a controversial and highly unpopular pardon from President Gloria Macapagal Arroyo.

It may be true that a convicted plunderer escaped the life sentence that he deserved through no fault of the prosecution panel, but for Sonny Marcelo, the work, for the moment, was done and the message had been sent to corrupt public officials, even those at the highest echelons of power – a few good men still exist who are willing to dedicate their lives, make the needed sacrifices and persevere to overcome numerous obstacles to see to it that justice is done and that the Rule of Law is followed.

Former Chief Justice Artemio Panganiban, in his column in the Philippine Daily Inquirer, praised Sonny Marcelo:

“(GMA) appointed a no-nonsense Ombudsman, Simeon Marcelo, who diligently investigated the charge, promptly filed the appropriate information and, together with Special Prosecutor Dennis Villa-Ignacio, vigorously prosecuted the former president (Estrada).”  (05 June 2010)

In the January 2008 issue of KILOSBAYAN, Sonny Marcelo and his team of prosecutors in the Estrada case were described as follows:

“They did what no legal team had done in Philippine history: win a corruption case against the biggest fish of all, a President of the Republic.

If the plunder trial of Joseph Ejercito Estrada were an inter-university basketball contest, it would have been a battle royale between the combined legal team of the Ateneo Blue Eagles and the University of the Philippines Fighting Maroons versus the All-Star Team.

Estrada’s All-Star Team had a Michael Jordan in Estelito Mendoza. Not only is Mendoza the highest paid lawyer in the country; it was he who was able to get another big fish—former First Lady Imelda Marcos—off the hook in 1998 when the Supreme Court reversed a Sandiganbayan verdict convicting her of graft.

The other ‘superstars’ in Estrada’s legal team were veteran trial lawyer Jose Flaminiano, former Senator Rene Saguisag, and former University of the Philippines College of Law Dean Pacifico Agabin. Two justices of the Supreme Court even showed up during major events of the trial to show their support for the ousted leader—retired Supreme Court Associate Justice Serafin Cuevas and former Supreme Court Chief Justice Andres Narvasa.

It took a great deal of teamwork and passion to beat star power.

The prosecution team was a mix of young, idealistic lawyers and senior colleagues disappointed with what their generation had done for the country. Together, they sought to apply the same rule of law that covers paupers to a former president, so that Lady Justice could perhaps start smiling at Philippine society.

x x x x

He is better known as the team’s court general and strategist. He first shot to national fame when he appeared at the impeachment trial of Estrada as one of the counsels for whistleblower former Ilocos Sur Gov. Luis ‘Chavit’ Singson. At the time, Marcelo was head of the litigation division of the Carpio Villaraza & Cruz law office, which likewise counseled President Arroyo until recently.

This attorney almost became a priest. He finished high school at the Maria Assumpta Seminary in Cabanatuan City and spent a few years at the San Jose Seminary before realizing that priesthood was not for him. He then entered the Ateneo de Manila University where he finished Bachelor of Arts in Philosophy. Marcelo bridges both the religious and non-sectarian academic environment, making him an ideal leader for the Ateneo-UP team. After Ateneo, he went to UP where he took his Bachelor of Laws.”

In the cover story that appeared in the 15 October 2007 issue of Philippines GRAPHIC, Inday Espina-Varona, its Editor-In-Chief, wrote:

“They’re not hobbits and the Philippines isn’t Middle Earth but a firm fellowship continues to glue the team of public and private prosecutors that won the historic Guilty verdict for plunder against deposed President Joseph Estrada.

x x x x

Both public and private prosecutors worked hand-in-hand and spent long hours to ensure that the evidence consisting of testimonies from 76 witnesses and voluminous documentary exhibits were properly presented in court and all the arguments raised by the defense in volumes of pleadings were adequately met.

The private lawyers toiled pro bono, practically sacrificing careers to reserve two days a week to the trial.

Arrayed against the star-studded defense team of the former President, the dedicated team was ‘driven by an unflagging commitment to uphold the rule of law,’ says Marcelo.

The idealism took on mythic proportions, adds an amused Marcelo, who recalls frequent allusions to J.R.R. Tolkien’s trilogy, ‘The Lord of the Rings.’

x x x x

Their biggest advantage, notes Marcelo, was the strange chemistry that bound the team.	

‘While I made the final decision, we always resolved (issues) by consensus. We talked for hours and managed to disagree without being disagreeable,’ the former Ombudsman points out. He laughs at the recollection.

‘It was extraordinary for a group of strong-willed lawyers of various persuasions and expertise.’

‘It also helped that the team was composed of hard-nosed professionals.

‘Lahat nag-aaral, lahat nagbabasa,’ Marcelo says. (We all studied and read.)”

x x x x

“When former Ombudsman and Solicitor-General Simeon Marcelo likens the prosecution team in the Estrada trial to a tenacious bulldog, he might as well be talking about himself.

Marcelo's brains were never a question even in his youth. He graduated with honors from the Ateneo de Manila University in 1974 with a Bachelor's Degree in Philosophy. At the University of the Philippines, he was a recipient of the Crispin Llamado Scholarship Award and graduated in 1979 among the top of his class. He later placed fifth in the 1979 Bar Examinations.

But in the legal trenches, bright guys are a dime a dozen. Determination and the ability to follow through with strategies, yet nimbly shift when needed are what win legal battles.” (Philippines Graphic, 15 October 2007, at page 24)

The accolades have been many.  But to Sonny Marcelo, the former seminarian, the Estrada plunder case was his personal crusade. It was not a matter of being acknowledged or respected as a lawyer - it was just the right thing to do for the nation:

“In the case of Marcos, there was never any closure. You seldom have second chances and we’re very lucky as a people to have a second chance,” he said then. “To some, the lesson of Edsa 1 is that if you’re going to steal, steal a lot so you have money to pay lawyers and you can get away with it. We must learn from that and let those who did wrong pay for it.” (Newsbreak, 2001)

Appropriately, the Estrada Plunder case will always be considered as Sonny Marcelo's paramount legacy to the country and to the legal profession.

As Solicitor General
Atty. Marcelo's legal brilliance led him to be appointed as the Solicitor General in February 2001. As the chief government lawyer, he skillfully led the government to victories in numerous monumental cases. During his term, he successfully handled before the Supreme Court the recovery of Ferdinand Marcos’ ill-gotten wealth, which was well-worth over US$680 Million. (To date, this is one of the biggest recovery of stolen assets from a corrupt government official worldwide; also, the Supreme Court judgement constituted the first final ruling that the Marcoses had acquired ill-gotten wealth during the late dictator’s regime.) Then Solicitor General Marcelo also successfully handled before the Supreme Court other foremost cases, including those involving the constitutionality of the Plunder Law, the revival of the prosecution of senior police officers (including one who is now a member of the Senate) involving the extrajudicial killing of a gang of suspected criminals, the recovery of shares of stock and dividends worth P70 Billion in connection with the coconut levy cases and the recovery of stockholdings worth P26 Billion from the family of one of the late dictator’s cronies. (Prior to his assumption of office as Solicitor General in 2001, the Government was able to recover only P26 Billion since 1986 from the Marcoses and their cronies.) By far, he is considered to be one of the most successful Solicitors General ever appointed, having won all of the major cases during his term in office.

As Ombudsman
In October 2002, he was appointed as Ombudsman. At the age of 49 years, he became the youngest appointee. As Ombudsman, his efforts in battling graft and corruption earned him local and international recognition. Although faced with severe lack of resources, with an operating budget of P350 Million compared to the 2013 budget of the Office of the Ombudsman in the amount of P1.7 Billion, he still astoundingly led a serious and effective crusade against corruption, earning him praises from both foreign and local media, including the Philippines’ normally critical newspapers, like The Washington Post (p. A14, 10 June 2005), which stated that Mr. Marcelo “restored credibility to that organization (referring to the Office of the Ombudsman).” As Ombudsman, Mr. Marcelo led the legal team which successfully prosecuted and secured the conviction of former President Joseph Estrada for plunder. Further, he actively supervised the prosecution of other major high-profile cases before the Sandiganbayan such as the President Diosdado Macapagal Boulevard case, the RSBS Pension Fund cases, the DPWH Repair Scam cases and the Major General Carlos F. Garcia cases.

During his three-year tenure as Ombudsman, upon assuming office, he immediately targeted “the most corrupt agencies, daring to prosecute even members of the historically untouchable military.” (p. A14, The Washington Post, 10 June 2005) During his crackdown on corruption in the military, among those he investigated and prosecuted included an active major general, several active and recently retired generals and a former chief of staff of the armed forces. He also investigated and prosecuted senior officials of the reputedly most corrupt government agencies, namely: Bureau of Customs, Bureau of Internal Revenue and Department of Public Works and Highways.

On 30 November 2005, due to serious health concerns, principally caused by his one-hundred-hour workweek, Mr. Marcelo was constrained to leave government service.  Juan Mercado, a well-respected Manila columnist, made the following comments about Atty. Marcelo’s resignation:

“Men of talent, vision and rock-hard integrity are the rarest of resources. That is especially true for nations, like the Philippines, where tainted ‘leaders’ handcuff us to treadmill crises.

Exasperated by political infighting, George Washington wrote: ‘Few have the virtue to withstand the highest bidder.’ Simeon Marcelo had what it took. International and local observers agree on that.

Street yokels, like us, got a first close look at this 1979 topnotcher during the Estrada impeachment trial.

People liked what they saw then: a talented comer without guile. In Adlai Stevenson’s words, he could ‘lead a cavalry charge without feeling funny astride a horse.’”

The Philippine Human Development Report 2008/2009 succinctly described the performance of the Office of the Ombudsman from its establishment in 1989 under Ombudsman Conrado Vasquez up to the present under Ombudsman Merceditas Gutierrez:

Table 1.16 	SWS rating of the sincerity of the OMB in fighting corruption (2000-2008)

Ratings in 2003-2005 correspond to “moderate” sincerity and in 2006-2008, “mediocre” sincerity.Source: Transparency and Accountability Network [2009]''

Insiders have attributed the OMB's inefficiency in the late 1980s and 1990s to a management system, installed by then Ombudsman Conrado Vasquez, that rewarded the fulfillment of quotas, regardless of total workload or complexity of cases, rather than the expeditious disposition of cases [Balgos, 1998].  The system was quite easily abused by prosecutors who would finish easier cases first, meet quotas, and leave the more complex or uninteresting ones untouched for months or years.

Collecting evidence was also a problem. While mandated to investigate, the OMB's Fact-Finding and Intelligence Bureau (FFIB) actually depended heavily on the National Bureau of Investigation (NBI)- in one case waiting seven years for their findings - and the COA. By the end of 1994, the OMB had a backlog of more than 14,500 cases, representing 65 percent of its total workload.

The improvement in public perception of the OMB (during the time of Ombudsman Marcelo) from 2002 to 2005 (notwithstanding law disposition rates) is also attributed to key institutional changes. Among these are the recognition of the importance of, and strengthening of, the Office of the Special Prosecutor (OSP) and Field Investigation Office (FIO) through training and recruitment; the delegation of powers to deputy Ombudsmen and the reengineering of other internal procedures to improve efficiency; and the strengthening of partnerships to fight corruption such as through the celebrated Solana Covenant among the OMB, the COA, and the CSC that outlined a more coordinated approach to fighting corruption. Relations with other partner organizations in the fight against corruption-the Presidential Anti-Graft Commission (PAGC) and civil society organizations such as the Transparency and Accountability Network (TAN) were also nurtured and criticism welcomed.

Apart from improved credibility, gains from these reforms were seen in immediate increases in the conviction rate-computed as the number of cases resulting in convictions, including guilty pleas, over the number of decided cases by the Sandiganbayan-from mere 6 percent to 14 percent. This trend spilled over to the next administration until 2007 when it reached 55 percent.

Conviction rates have since decreased sharply, however, falling dramatically to 14.4 percent by the first semester of 2008, with rates as low as 5 percent in March, 3 percent in May, and zero percent in June. Performance and trust have been further undermined by the OMB's action- or inaction- on high-profile cases. These include the P2 billion purchase of automated counting machines by the Commission on Elections (COMELEC) from Mega Pacific for the 2004 national elections, the $2 million bribery case involving former Justice Secretary Hernando Perez, the P728 million fertilizer fund scam, and the multi-million dollar NBN-ZTE deal.

The first was inexplicably resolved with two conflicting resolutions-one finding liability of at least one senior Comelec official (June 2006) and another finding no one liable (September 2006). This was in stark contrast to a Supreme Court decision on a case filed separately by private citizens: the High Tribunal found the contract null and void with the attendant procurement irregularities.

The second-involving Perez, the former boss of incumbent Ombudsman Merceditas Gutierrez, was said to be deliberately defective. A two-year wait in the filing of the case resulted in its dismissal due to technical lapses. Investigation findings and resolutions on the third and fourth cases, brought before the OMB in June 2004 and August 2007, respectively, have yet to be issued.

Not surprisingly, observers attributed the slide in performance and credibility to the undoing by the incumbent Ombudsman of the very institutional reforms that had previously strengthened the organization. Decisions have been recentralized, including cases pending with the Deputy Ombudsmen for Luzon, Visayas, and Mindanao involving governors and vice-governors. Relations with the OSP have become strained. The latter is accompanied by a 'no hire' policy, despite 36 percent of prosecutorial positions being vacant, and overt distrust as manifested by the requirement that OSP subordinates report directly to the incumbent Ombudsman weekly.

Most unfortunate for the fight against corruption on the macro level is the deactivation of the Inter-Agency Anti-Graft Coordinating Council(IAGC), which was composed of the OMB, the COA, and the CSC. As chair, the OMB simply did not convene the council. The incumbent Ombudsman also cut off relations with CSOs critical of her agency.

x x x x

Open voting in the JBC will be a significant step in strengthening the independence of the judiciary and the OMB and, thus, the quality of enforcement of public accountability. Beyond this, the JBC could itself design and adopt an independent search mechanism for qualified candidates that would do away with (or at least explicitly circumscribe) the influence of recommendations from politicians.

Anecdotal precedents exist in different contexts. During the term of Comelec Chair Christian S. Monsod (1991-1995), for instance, it was explicitly announce that contrary to past practice, endorsements from national or local elected officials or political party members would penalize rather than strengthen personnel applications for election officers and other staff positions, for obvious conflict of interest reasons. Former Ombudsman Simeon Marcelo (2002-2005) also instituted an analogous practice, stringently screening personnel applicants and conducting thorough background (integrity) investigations. It is no coincidence that the credibility and performance of Comelec and Ombudsman peaked during the incumbency of these two officials.

After his resignation, Mr. Marcelo then took a sabbatical (2006) which he utilized to regain his physical strength and to spend time with his family. The following year (2007), working only part-time, he became a Professor of Evidence and a member of the Board of Trustees of Arellano University Law School and served as the Executive Secretary of the Asian Development Bank Administrative Tribunal.

Recently, in an article that appeared in the front page of the Philippine Daily Inquirer (Philippines' most widely circulated newspaper), he was described as follows: "Marcelo served as a widely admired Ombudsman, with a solid reputation for incorruptibility." (at p. 1, 24 May 2009)

In 2013, in recognition of his outstanding contribution to the country, Atty. Marcelo was given the University of the Philippines Alumni Association (UPAA) Distinguished Alumnus Award for Public Service.

As law partner and advocate
In January 2008, he returned to private practice by joining his former law firm and became a name partner of the Villaraza Cruz Marcelo & Angangco Law Offices. Commenting on his return to his old law firm, The Philippine Starweek, the most circulated Philippine Sunday magazine, on its 17 February 2008 issue, stated that Atty. Marcelo is “acknowledged as perhaps the country’s best litigator.” (p. 5) This reputation of Atty. Marcelo was further enhanced when he led the legal team that represented the Lopez Management during last year's bitterly fought annual stockholders’ election of directors of Manila Electric Company (Meralco), the country biggest utility company. As a result of decisive legal victories at the Court of Appeals and the Supreme Court by Atty. Marcelo and his legal team, the Management was able to thwart the attempted take-over of Meralco by the Government Service Insurance System, suspected by many as actually acting on behalf of San Miguel Corporation, headed by a close friend and extremely close political ally of the Presidential couple.

In 2009, Mr. Marcelo's services were tapped by the Bangko Sentral ng Pilipinas (Central Bank of the Philippines) to prosecute the owner and officers of the Legacy group in the biggest bank fraud case in the country's history. At present, his team of trial lawyers and prosecuting those guilty of the scam for the crime of syndicated estafa, on non-bailable offense, in several trial courts in the country.

Also in 2009, Mr. Marcelo led his team of tax litigation experts in representing one of the country's leading companies in a P7-billion tax collection suit, perhaps the country's biggest tax case in recent years. A favorable Decision was rendered in early 2013 by the Third Division of the Court of Tax Appeals. (The Decision was appealed by the Office of the Solicitor General to the Court of Tax Appeals En Banc and is now submitted for resolution.) Also, he and his team secured in 2014 a significant legal victory in the Supreme Court in a multi-billion Case. Further, he and his tax team secured last year a Suspension Order from the Court of Tax Appeals to stop the Bureau of Internal Revenue from proceeding with the collection of tax assessments involving hundreds of millions of pesos against one of the clients of their law firm.

Aside from being a successful litigator in both private and public arenas, he also served, prior to joining the government in 2001, as the Chairperson of the Integrated Bar of the Philippines’ National Committee on Legal Aid and was head of its Task Force on Child Abuse, as well as the Executive Editor of its Law Journal.  Among the cases handled by the Integrated Bar of the Philippines during Atty. Marcelo's incumbency as Chairman of its National Committee on Legal Aid is the notorious Marikina rape-slay case. Atty. Marcelo and a team of trial lawyers from his law office helped the Department of Justice prosecutors to reverse the acquittal of the accused rapists and to order a new trial. (Because of the constitutional prohibition against double jeopardy, it is next-to-impossible to reverse an acquittal in a criminal case.) The Court of Appeals nullified the acquittal of the accused on the ground that the prosecution was not accorded due process by the judge during the trial of the case. The Supreme Court later upheld this ruling.

During the new trial, the same team of lawyers, headed by Atty. Marcelo, helped tremendously in the prosecution by securing key evidence such as the testimony of television reporter Gus Abelgas, before whom some of the accused confessed their commission of the crime while being interviewed on camera. They also convinced an eyewitness, who did not testify during the first trial out of fear, to testify during the new trial. They also extensively interviewed key witnesses who testified in the prior trial in preparation for the new trial, did the essential research and drafted all necessary pleadings for the public prosecutors. At the end of the new trial, the trial court rendered a verdict of guilt against all accused.

At present, he is involved as legal counsel in numerous high-profile cases in the regional trial courts, the Court of Appeals and the Supreme Court, apart being actively involved in the good governance and anti-corruption movement in the country.

Atty. Marcelo is now a name partner of the Cruz Marcelo & Tenefrancia Law Offices.

Affiliations

On 19 September 2008, Atty. Marcelo, an apparent international recognition of his expertise in the field of good governance and anti-corruption, was appointed as one of the four members of the World Bank's new Independent Advisory Board (IAB), which provides advice on good governance and effective anti-corruption measures to the Bank's president, Audit Committee and Department of Integrity. In March of this year (2009), the Asia Foundation engaged his services as an International Anti-Corruption Consultant to assist in the good governance and anti-corruption projects of the Mongolian Government. He served as the executive secretary of the Administrative Tribunal of the Asian Development Bank from 2007 to 2010. After serving since 2007 as a director and first vice-president of the Philippine Bar Association, the country's oldest and largest voluntary organization of lawyers, Atty. Marcelo served as its president from 2009 to 2010

Atty. Marcelo served last year a USAID consultant for anti-corruption and good governance in relation to its project to strengthen the Sandiganbayan and the Office of the Ombudsman.

See also
Philippine Ombudsman

Notes

1953 births
20th-century Filipino lawyers
Ombudsmen in the Philippines
Solicitors General of the Philippines
Living people
Arroyo administration personnel
Ateneo de Manila University alumni
University of the Philippines alumni
21st-century Filipino lawyers